Sandhurst South  was an electoral district of the Legislative Assembly in the Australian state of Victoria from 1889 to 1904. It was based on an area south of the town of Sandhurst (now Bendigo) south-east of High street and the south west of Russell-street,  Strathfieldsaye shire and most of Marong shire.

In 1904, Sandhurst South (and Electoral district of Sandhurst) were abolished and two new districts created, Bendigo West and Bendigo East.

Members

References

Former electoral districts of Victoria (Australia)
1889 establishments in Australia
1904 disestablishments in Australia